TEQ is an acronym for:
TEQ (TV channel), full name Télévision Ethnique du Québec, now CJNT-DT
Time domain equalizer, in Orthogonal frequency-division multiplexing.
Tax equalization
 Terra Est Quaestuosa, an online, text-based real-time strategy game
Toxic equivalent (dioxin) for dioxins
Tradable Energy Quotas
Tekirdağ Çorlu Airport

it may also refer to
 teq, the international code for the Temein language in ISO 639-3